Wild & Blue is the fourth studio album by American country music artist John Anderson. It was released in September 1982 under Warner Bros. Records. It includes the Number One country hits "Swingin'" and "Wild and Blue".

Track listing

Personnel
 John Anderson - lead vocals
 Fred Carter Jr. - acoustic guitar, electric guitar
 Beckie Foster - background vocals
 Joy Gardner - background vocals
 Dennis Good - trombone
 Lloyd Green - dobro, steel guitar
 Merle Haggard - vocals on "Long Black Veil"
 Emmylou Harris - vocals on "The Waltz You Save for Me"
 Allen Henson - background vocals
 Mike Jordon - organ
 Larrie Londin - drums
 Cam Mullins - string arrangements
 The Nashville String Machine - strings
 Billy Puett - tenor saxophone
 Hargus "Pig" Robbins - piano
 Don Sheffield - trumpet
 Buddy Spicher - fiddle
 Henry Strzelecki - bass guitar
 Pete Wade - electric guitar
 Bobby Thompson - banjo

Chart performance

References

John Anderson (musician) albums
1982 albums
Warner Records albums